Inonotus rigidus is a species of fungus in the family Hymenochaetaceae. It is distinguished by its resupinate and rigid basidiocarps, its yellow pore surface, being microscopically ellipsoid and yellowish brown, its thick-walled basidiospores, and by lacking both setal hyphae and hymenial setae.

References

Further reading
Yu, Hai-You, Chang-Lin Zhao, and Yu-Cheng Dai. "Inonotus niveomarginatus and I. tenuissimus spp. nov.(Hymenochaetales), resupinate species from tropical China." Mycotaxon 124.1 (2013): 61–68.

External links
 

Fungal tree pathogens and diseases
rigidus
Fungi described in 2011